The 1909 Kentucky Derby was the 35th running of the Kentucky Derby. The race took place on May 3, 1909.

Full results

Winning Breeder: Jerome B. Respess; (OH)
Horses T.M. Green, Ada Meade, and Woolwinder scratched before the race.

Payout

 The winner received a purse of $4,850.
 Second place received $700.
 Third place received $300.

References

1909
Kentucky Derby
Derby
May 1909 sports events
1909 in American sports